Call It Luck is a 1934 American comedy film directed by James Tinling and written by Dudley Nichols and Lamar Trotti. The film stars Pat Paterson, Herbert Mundin, Charles Starrett, Gordon Westcott, Georgia Caine and Theodore von Eltz. The film was released on June 1, 1934, by Fox Film Corporation.

Plot

Cast
Pat Paterson as Pat Laurie
Herbert Mundin as Herbert Biggelwade
Charles Starrett as Stan Russell
Gordon Westcott as 'Lucky' Luke Bartlett
Georgia Caine as Amy Lark
Theodore von Eltz as Nat Underwood
Reginald Mason as Lord Poindexter
Ernest Wood as Sid Carter
Ray Mayer as 'Brainwave' Flynn
Susan Fleming as Alice Blue

References

External links 
 

1934 films
Fox Film films
American comedy films
1934 comedy films
Films directed by James Tinling
American black-and-white films
Films scored by Samuel Kaylin
1930s English-language films
1930s American films